A list of windmills in the traditional county of Lincolnshire.


Locations

A

B

C

D, E

F

G

H

I - K

L

M

N, O

P, Q

R, S

T, U

W

Maps
1824 Ordnance Survey

Notes

Mills in bold are still standing, known building dates are indicated in bold. Text in italics denotes indicates that the information is not confirmed, but is likely to be the case stated.

Sources

Unless indicated otherwise, the source for all entries is

 and/or

References

Lists of windmills in England
Windmills